Frontier Fury is a 1943 American Western directed by William Berke and starring Charles Starrett.

Plot
In this western, a decent Indian agent loses his job and his good name after someone steals the government money he was to deliver to a tribe. Because he cannot bear to see the people starve over the long winter, he begins searching for the robbers. He does so by looking for the unusual coins that been included in the payroll.

Cast
 Charles Starrett as Steve Langdon
 Roma Aldrich as Stella Larkin
 Arthur Hunnicutt as Arkansas Tuttle (as Arthur 'Arkansas' Hunnicutt)
 Jimmie Davis as Jimmie Davis
 Jimmie Davis and His Singing Buckaroos as Musicians

References

External links
 

1943 films
1943 Western (genre) films
American Western (genre) films
1940s English-language films
Columbia Pictures films
Films directed by William A. Berke
American black-and-white films
1940s American films